Albert Edward Winship (February 24, 1845 – February 16, 1933) was a pioneering American educator and educational journalist.

Biography
Winship was born in West Bridgewater, Massachusetts. He attended Andover Theological Seminary in 1875.  He was a pastor from 1876 to 1883.  He had transferred himself over to the field of education by 1886 when he became editor of the Journal of Education, Boston, which grew to become one of the most influential educational magazines in the country.

From 1903 to 1909,  Winship was a member of the Massachusetts State Board of Education. His published works include: Life of Horace Mann (1896) and Great American Educators (1900). He was the father of librarian and author George Parker Winship and of The Boston Globe editor Laurence L. Winship.

He died at his home in Cambridge on February 16, 1933.

Sources

References

External links

1845 births
1933 deaths
People from West Bridgewater, Massachusetts
American male journalists
American magazine editors
American non-fiction writers
American educational theorists
Andover Theological Seminary alumni